Barbie Storymaker is a 1997 movie-making kit video game by Mattel Media, within the Barbie franchise. Buzzfeed described it as a virtual representation of doll-playing. SuperKids felt it was a great way for mothers and daughters to create stories together. The Independent praised the title for teaching players both computer skills and film-production techniques.

References

1997 video games
Barbie video games
Mattel video games